The 2016 European championships of international draughts were held from 18 to 24 October in Izmir, Turkey over 9 rounds Swiss-system tournament. There were 32 participants from 14 countries, including, 14 grandmasters, 4 international masters and 6 masters of the FMJD.

The winner was Alexei Chizhov from Russia, silver was for Roel Boomstra from the Netherlands, third was Martijn van IJzendoorn from the Netherlands.

Results

Classics

Rapid

Blitz

Superblitz

Links 
 European Championship 2016
 Site European Championship in Izmir
 The results of the championship

2016 in draughts
2016
2016 in Turkish sport
International sports competitions hosted by Turkey
Sports competitions in Izmir
October 2016 sports events in Europe
2010s in İzmir